A constitutional referendum was held in Ivory Coast (which included Upper Volta at the time) on 13 October 1946 as part of the wider French constitutional referendum. Although the proposed new constitution was rejected by 71% of voters in the territory, it was approved 53% of voters overall.

Results

References

1946 referendums
October 1946 events in Africa
1946
1946 in French Upper Volta
1946
1946 in Ivory Coast
Constitutional referendums in France